Plumbum, or The Dangerous Game ("Plyumbum, ili Opasnaya igra") is a 1987 Soviet coming-of-age drama film directed by Vadim Abdrashitov.

The film was entered into the main competition at the 44th edition of the Venice Film Festival, where it received the President of the Italian Senate's Gold Medal.

Plot
Fifteen year old gifted teenager Ruslan Chutko longs to do good and help the police to identify offenses under the pseudonym Plumbum (Latin for - Lead). Plumbum decides in a single provincial town to eradicate the evil. However, in his interest of being a fighter against evil he goes far beyond what is permitted in a children's play and ends up ruthlessly invading people's lives.

Cast 
 Anton Androsov as Ruslan 'Plyumbum' Chutko 
 Yelena Dmitriyeva as Sonya 
 Elena Yakovleva as Maria 
 Zoya Lirova as Ruslan's mother 
 Aleksandr Pashutin as Ruslan's father 
 Aleksandr Feklistov as 'Grey-Hair', the Militia commander 
 Vladimir Steklov as Lopatov 
 Aleksey Zaytsev as Kolya-Oleg

References

External links

1987 drama films
1987 films
Films directed by Vadim Abdrashitov
Russian drama films
Soviet teen films